Jan Poděbradský (born March 1, 1974 in Prague) is a retired male decathlete from the Czech Republic, who also competed in the men's 400 metres during his career. He set his personal best (8314 points) in the decathlon on June 4, 2000 in Arles, France. Poděbradský is a two-time national champion (2002 and 2004) in the decathlon.

Achievements

External links
 

1974 births
Living people
Czech decathletes
Czech male sprinters
Athletes from Prague